Jacob's Creek is a small creek located in Mid North region of the Australian state of South Australia.

Course and features
The watercourse is studded with ancient and picturesque River Red Gums.

It was first discovered (but not named) by Europeans in December 1837 by an expedition led Colonel William Light and was surveyed in 1839 by his assistant surveyor, William Jacob (1814–1902), as part of a wider survey of the Barossa region. Jacob settled here in the early 1840s, hence the origin of the name. In the local aboriginal dialect it is called "Cowieaurita", meaning "yellow-brown water", in an area known to them as Moorooroo, which became the name of the Hundred.

In the early 1840s Jacob's Creek was briefly home to Johann Menge, South Australia's first geologist, who lived for some time on an island and in nearby cave on the creek. Here he grew vegetables, and was particularly struck with the possibilities for viticulture. Menge was influential in facilitating the settlement from the Barossa Valley by German Lutheran immigrants.

Johann Gramp, the founder of Orlando Wines, first planted grape vines on the banks of Jacob's Creek in 1847.

In 1997 Orlando Wines, in conjunction with the Northern Adelaide and Barossa Catchment Water Management Board, commenced a rejuvenation project for Jacob's Creek. All non-native plants and trees, such as bamboo, ash, and olives were removed, and replanted with blue gums, red gums and other Australian native trees and shrubs. As a result of the project, many native species of frogs, native fish, and waterbirds have returned, with the creek gradually returning to its former natural state.

See also

References

Rivers of South Australia
Barossa Valley
Mid North (South Australia)